Robert Alton Harris (January 15, 1953 – April 21, 1992) was an American car thief, burglar, kidnapper and murderer who was executed at San Quentin State Prison in 1992 for the 1978 murders of two teenage boys in San Diego. His execution was the first in the state of California since 1967.

Harris was born in Fort Bragg, North Carolina, and was abused as a child. He had run-ins with police as early as age 10, and was first placed into juvenile detention at age 13 for stealing a car. His mother abandoned him at age 14 and he was soon after placed into juvenile detention after stealing another car. Following his release he found work, married, and had a son. In 1975 he was imprisoned for manslaughter and paroled in January 1978.

On July 5, 1978, Harris and his younger brother commandeered a car occupied by two 16-year-old boys, John Mayeski and Michael Baker, ordered them to drive to a remote area, then killed them. The brothers then used the car as their getaway car when they robbed a bank in San Diego. He was arrested less than an hour after the robbery and charged with murder, auto theft, kidnapping, burglary, and bank robbery. One of the arresting officers, Steve Baker, was the father of one of the murdered boys, but did not realize the victim was his son until later. Harris was convicted and sentenced to death on March 6, 1979. After a series of appeals and stays of execution, he was executed in San Quentin's gas chamber on April 21, 1992.

Early life and criminal record/history
Robert Alton Harris was born at Fort Bragg in North Carolina, the fifth of nine children of Kenneth and Evelyn Harris. Kenneth was a sergeant in the United States Army who was awarded a Silver Star and Purple Heart for his service in World War II. Both parents were alcoholics, and Robert reportedly was born two months premature as a result of Kenneth kicking Evelyn in the abdomen; Robert is also reported to have suffered from fetal alcohol syndrome. Robert was especially targeted for abuse by his father, who believed that Robert was conceived in an affair. The Harris family moved to Visalia, California in 1962 following Kenneth Harris' discharge from the Army. Kenneth Harris was jailed in 1963 for 18 months and again for a longer period of time in 1964, both times for sexually abusing his daughters. With Kenneth in jail, the remaining family members lived a migrant life around the San Joaquin Valley.

Robert spent four months in juvenile hall at age 13 for stealing a car. During his time at the juvenile detention centre, Harris was repeatedly raped. In 1967, Evelyn abandoned Robert, then 14, in Sacramento and left him to fend for himself. After making his way to Oklahoma to live with his brother and sister, he stole a car and was subsequently arrested in Florida. He spent the next three years in the Florida juvenile detention system, but when he turned 19, the system could no longer keep him, and he was sent to Chula Vista, California. In June 1973 Harris married, and the couple had a son, Robert, Jr., born in October 1974. In 1975 while living in a trailer park in Imperial County, Harris beat his brother Ken’s roommate, James Wheeler, to death, claiming he did so to protect the victim's wife; however, it was later determined that he beat the victim without provocation. He was convicted of voluntary manslaughter and imprisoned in San Luis Obispo; during his imprisonment Harris' wife filed for divorce. Harris was paroled in January 1978.

San Diego murders
Sometime in May or June 1978, Robert, then aged 25, asked his brother Daniel, 18, for help in planning a bank robbery. On July 2, Daniel stole two guns from a neighbor's house in Visalia, California, and the two drove to San Diego that night. They spent the next two days purchasing ammunition and practicing the robbery in a rural area near Miramar Lake.

On July 5, the Harris brothers happened upon John Mayeski and Michael Baker, both 16, sitting in a green Ford LTD eating cheeseburgers in a supermarket parking lot in Mira Mesa. Mayeski and Baker were best friends who had planned to spend the day fishing to celebrate Mayeski's newly acquired driver's license. Robert Harris commandeered Mayeski's car and ordered him to drive to Miramar Lake, with Daniel Harris following in another vehicle. Robert Harris told the boys that they would be using the vehicle to rob a bank, but that no one would be hurt. At Miramar Lake, the Harris brothers ordered the boys to kneel, whereupon the boys began to pray. Robert told the boys to "Quit crying, and die like men", then shot both boys multiple times. The Harris brothers then returned to Robert's Mira Mesa home and allegedly finished the victims' half-eaten cheeseburgers while Robert boasted about the killings.

About an hour later, the Harris brothers robbed the Mira Mesa branch of the San Diego Trust and Savings Bank located across the street from where they had abducted Mayeski and Baker, and fled with about $2,000. A witness to the robbery followed the Harrises to their home and notified police. The Harris brothers were arrested less than an hour after the robbery. One of the officers who apprehended the Harris brothers was Steven Baker, father of victim Michael Baker, who at the time was unaware that his son had been killed, let alone by one of the men he was arresting.

Conviction and execution

The San Diego County District Attorney's Office filed felony charges of auto theft, kidnapping, murder and burglary against Robert Harris, while the U.S. Attorney's Office filed bank robbery charges against him. Harris pleaded guilty to a federal charge of bank robbery and received a 25-year sentence.

On March 6, 1979, Robert Harris was convicted in the San Diego County Superior Court of two counts of murder in the first degree with special circumstances as well as two counts of kidnapping, and was sentenced to death. Daniel Harris was convicted of kidnapping and sentenced to six years in state prison; he was released in 1983.

An appeal for clemency to California governor Pete Wilson – who was mayor of San Diego at the time of the killings – was rejected in a live television news conference, where Wilson read a statement acknowledging Harris' abusive childhood but ended with a clear rejection of the clemency request, saying, "As great as is my compassion for Robert Harris the child, I cannot excuse or forgive the choice made by Robert Harris the man." Wilson then left without waiting for reporters' questions.

Harris' death sentence was affirmed by the Supreme Court of California in 1981. In 1982, the United States Court of Appeals for the Ninth Circuit granted a writ of habeas corpus relieving Harris of the death sentence, vacating a contrary district court order. The Supreme Court of the United States reimposed Harris' death sentence in Pulley v. Harris (1984), reversing the Ninth Circuit by a vote of 7–2.

In 1990, federal appeals court judge John T. Noonan Jr. issued a stay of execution, as Harris argued that childhood brain damage interfered with his judgment during his crimes.

Harris was scheduled to die on April 21, 1992. On April 18, U.S. District Judge Marilyn Hall Patel issued a temporary restraining order barring Harris' execution while she considered his lawsuit challenging the gas chamber's constitutionality. On April 22, the Ninth Circuit issued an emergency writ of mandate vacating the restraining order, in which Judge Arthur Alarcón was joined by Judge Melvin T. Brunetti, over the dissent of Judge Noonan.

On April 20, the U.S. Supreme Court vacated a separate stay of execution the Ninth Circuit had issued on Harris' habeas corpus petition. That evening, a group of Ninth Circuit judges ordered the execution stayed while the circuit considered granting en banc consideration of his lawsuit. Later that evening, the Ninth Circuit entered a third stay blocking the execution while it reconsidered reimposing the lower court's temporary restraining order. That night, the U.S. Supreme Court issued a per curiam decision vacating the Ninth Circuit's stays and allowing the execution to proceed, by a vote of 7–2.

On April 21, 1992, at 3:49 a.m., Harris was strapped into the gas chamber. Seconds before execution, Ninth Circuit Judge Harry Pregerson stayed the execution for the fourth time, explaining that Harris should be allowed to begin a new lawsuit in state court. Two hours later, the U.S. Supreme Court vacated that stay, explicitly ordering "No further stays of Robert Alton Harris' execution shall be entered by the federal courts except upon order of this Court."

Harris was executed on April 21, 1992, in the gas chamber at San Quentin State Prison – the first execution in California in 25 years. For his last meal, he requested and was given a 21-piece bucket of Kentucky Fried Chicken, two large Domino's pizzas, a bag of jelly beans, a six-pack of Pepsi, and a pack of Camel cigarettes. At 6:01 a.m., Harris was escorted into the gas chamber. The execution order was given at 6:07 a.m. and Harris died at 6:21 a.m. His body was removed from the chamber at 7:00 a.m. and was taken to a funeral home at 8:15 a.m.

Harris's execution is specifically remembered for his choice of final words (recorded by Warden Daniel Vasquez): "You can be a king or a street sweeper, but everybody dances with the grim reaper." It was the subject of a 1995 Dutch documentary film, Procedure 769, witness to an execution. His words are based on the 1991 film ''Bill & Ted's Bogus Journey as "You might be a king or a little street sweeper but sooner or later you dance with the reaper."

See also
 Capital punishment in California
 Capital punishment in the United States
 List of people executed in California

References

External links
 (private video)

1953 births
1992 deaths
20th-century executions by California
20th-century executions of American people
American murderers of children
American people convicted of manslaughter
American people executed for murder
Executed people from North Carolina
People convicted of murder by California
People executed by California by gas chamber
People from Fort Bragg, North Carolina
Prisoners and detainees of Florida